The following highways are/were numbered 947:

United States